Davor Mladina (born 26 November 1959) is a Croatian professional football manager. He is the current manager of First League (II) Rudeš

Managerial career
In March 2021 he took charge of Međimurje and in August 2021 he was appointed for the sixth time by Hrvatski Dragovoljac.

Mladina was named manager of Rudeš in October 2022. He also worked at Imotski, Marsonia, Mosor, Primorac 1929, GOŠK Gabela, Široki Brijeg, Lučko, Gorica, Ras Al-Khaimah, Cibalia and was for one game in charge of Austrian side SV Horn. He also won the Bosnian Cup with Orašje.

Honours

Manager
Cibalia 
2. HNL: 2004–05 (North)

Orašje
Bosnian Cup: 2005–06

References

External links
Davor Mladina at Soccerway

1959 births
Living people
Sportspeople from Split, Croatia
Croatian football managers
NK Široki Brijeg managers
NK Marsonia managers
HNK Cibalia managers
HNK Orašje managers
NK Imotski managers
NK Mosor managers
NK Hrvatski Dragovoljac managers
NK GOŠK Gabela managers
NK Lučko managers
HNK Gorica managers
SV Horn managers
NK Međimurje managers
NK Rudeš managers
Premier League of Bosnia and Herzegovina managers
Croatian expatriate football managers
Expatriate football managers in Bosnia and Herzegovina
Croatian expatriate sportspeople in Bosnia and Herzegovina
Expatriate football managers in the United Arab Emirates
Croatian expatriate sportspeople in the United Arab Emirates
Expatriate football managers in Austria
Croatian expatriate sportspeople in Austria